Broken Comedy (Spanish: Comedia rota) is a 1978 Argentine film.

Cast
Julia von Grolman
Ignacio Quirós
Gianni Lunadei
Elsa Daniel
Arturo García Buhr
Thelma Stefani
Elena Tasisto
Nelly Prono
Darwin Sanchez
Ricardo Fasan
Jimeno del San Cuilco
Luis Cordara
Claudia Palmucci
Virginia Romay

External links 
 

1978 films
Argentine drama films
1970s Spanish-language films
1970s Argentine films